The 1999 Pau Grand Prix was a Formula Three motor race held on 23 May 1999 at the Pau circuit, in Pau, Pyrénées-Atlantiques, France. The Grand Prix was won by Benoît Tréluyer, driving for Signature Team. Sébastien Dumez finished second and Peter Sundberg third.

Entry List

Classification

Qualification Race 
Tréluyer lead a seemingly immaculate race to take the win in the first race of two and set himself up nicely for the feature race. He was followed by Calcagni and Dumez.

Main Race 
An exceptional race by Tréluyer meant that he would lead from start-to-finish. Bourdais was seemingly the only person who could mount such a challenge, but after retiring on lap 15, it was a relatively easy run until the finish for Tréluyer. Although, Dumez did close up the gap considerably toward the end, with the winning margin being less than two seconds.

References

Pau Grand Prix
1999 in French motorsport